Guram Gabiskiria (2 March 1947 – 27 September 1993) was a Mayor of Sukhumi who was murdered by Abkhaz separatists during the ethnic cleansing of Georgians in Abkhazia in 1993.

Biography
Guram Gabiskiria was born on 2 March 1947 in Sukhumi, Georgian SSR. Gabiskia graduated from the State University of M. Gorki with a degree in history but excelled as a soccer player. He played for the Dinamo Sukhumi in the late 1960s and later continued his career in Stavropol, Minsk and Kislovodsk before joining CSKA (Tbilisi). In 1972, he became a soccer referee of republican level and two years later upgraded himself to the union level soccer referee. As a result of political tensions in the USSR in 1989 all the Georgian teams except for Dinamo Sukhumi left the Soviet championship. Gabiskiria helped to create Sukhumi-based Tskhumi soccer club (which played in the newly formed Georgian football league) where he served as a president. In 1990 he was a candidate in the elections for the parliament of Abkhazian Autonomous Republic but gave up his claims in favour of Tamaz Nadareishvili.

Gabiskiria became a mayor of Sukhumi in 1992 and joined the Council of Ministers and the Council of Self-Defense of Abkhazian Autonomous Republic during the Georgian-Abkhazian War in 1993. When the city of Sukhumi fell to the Abkhaz separatists on 27 September 1993, Gabiskiria along with other authorities from the Government of Abkhazian Autonomous Republic (Zhiuli Shartava, Raul Eshba, Mamia Alasania, and others) refused to leave the besieged city and was captured by Abkhaz militants and North Caucasian mercenaries. Based on video materials, Human rights documents and witness accounts of the event, G. Gabiskiria, Z. Shartava, R. Eshba and other members of the government were dragged outside of the parliament building and forced to kneel by the Abkhaz/North Caucasian militants. Gabiskiria refused to do so by replying in Russian: "Never in my life!” ("Никогда в жизни!")

All captured members of the government including Gabiskiria were murdered by the Abkhaz militants. They were all executed without trial. In 2005, American journalist Malcolm Linton displayed his photo materials taken during the war in Abkhazia at the art gallery in Tbilisi, where Gabiskiria's son Vladimir Gabiskiria identified his father among the pile of corpses (along with Zhiuli Shartava and other members of the government), clearly visible on one of the photographs.

On 27 September 2017, Gabiskiria was posthumously awarded by President Giorgi Margvelashvili the title and Order of National Hero. His remains were uncovered and interred with military honors in Tbilisi in October 2017.

On 31 October 2019, in Georgia Today, Tbilisi mayor Kakha Kaladze was reported to have announced that Gabiskiria will be honored with a statue in Tbilisi, alongside Zhiuli Shartava.

References

External links 
 
 (right-click to open file)

Assassinated Abkhazian politicians
Ethnic cleansing of Georgians in Abkhazia
1947 births
1993 deaths
Footballers from Abkhazia
Footballers from Georgia (country)
Mayors of Sukhumi
Abkhaz–Georgian conflict
Abkhazian murder victims
FC Dinamo Sukhumi players
Soviet football referees
Sportspeople from Sukhumi
People from Sukhumi
1993 in Georgia (country)
20th-century politicians from Georgia (country)
National Heroes of Georgia
Association footballers not categorized by position
Soviet footballers
FC Guria Lanchkhuti players
FC Neman Grodno players